Priem is a surname. Notable people with the surname include:

Cees Priem (born 1950), Dutch professional road bicycle racer
Curtis Priem, American computer scientist
Tristan Priem (born 1976), Australian racing cyclist

See also
Prime (surname)